Kenneth Burke (born 1984) is an Irish hurler who played as a left wing-forward for the Galway senior hurling team.

An All-Ireland-winning captain in the under-21 grade, Burke made his first appearance for the senior team during the 2003 National League and became a regular member of the team over the next few seasons. During that time he failed to claim any honours at senior level. His brother, David, also plays hurling for Galway.

At club level Burke plays with the St Thomas's club.

References

1984 births
Living people
St Thomas's hurlers
Galway inter-county hurlers
Hurling selectors
Irish electricians